Tiit Land (born 25 September 1964, Tartu) is an Estonian biochemist.

From 1994 until 1999, Land worked as a researcher at the National Institutes of Health in the United States. From 1999 until 2006, he was a researcher and lecturer at the Stockholm University's Neurochemistry Neurotoxicology Institute. From 2007 until 2011 he worked as a professor and chair of chemistry at Tallinn University's Department of Natural Sciences, Institute of Mathematics, and Natural Sciences. On 14 February 2011, Land was elected rector of Tallinn University. On 8 February 2016, he was re-elected for a second term.

Since 1 September 2020, he is the rector of Tallinn University of Technology.

References

1964 births
Living people
Estonian biochemists
University of Tartu alumni
Stockholm University alumni
Academic staff of Stockholm University
Academic staff of Tallinn University
Academic staff of the Tallinn University of Technology
People from Tartu